The 1951 NFL season was the 32nd regular season of the National Football League. Prior to the season, Baltimore Colts owner Abraham Watner faced financial difficulties, and thus gave his team and its player contracts back to the league for $50,000. However, many Baltimore fans started to protest the loss of their team. Supporting groups such as its fan club and its marching band remained in operation and worked for the team's revival, which eventually led to a new, more lucrative Baltimore team in 1953 that ultimately carried on the erratic lineage of the last remaining Ohio League member Dayton Triangles.

For the first time, the NFL Championship Game was televised across the nation. The DuMont Television Network paid $75,000 to broadcast the game. Viewers coast-to-coast watched the Los Angeles Rams defeat the Cleveland Browns

Draft
The 1951 NFL Draft was held from January 18-19, 1951 at Chicago's Blackstone Hotel. With the first pick, the New York Giants selected halfback Kyle Rote from Southern Methodist University.

Major rule changes
 No offensive tackle, guard, or center would be eligible to catch or touch a forward pass.
Aluminum shoe cleats are banned.

Regular season

Highlights
In Week One (September 30), the defending champions, the Cleveland Browns, opened with a loss, falling to their old AAFC rival in San Francisco, 24–10; the Giants tied the Steelers 13–13 in a Monday night game on national radio.
Week Four (October 21) in Detroit, the Lions had a 24–17 win cancelled when the New York Yanks tied the game, which would be important later.
In Week Five (October 28), The Browns beat the Giants 14–13 on a missed extra point, putting Cleveland half a game ahead to lead the American Conference.  In Detroit, the Bears' Ed Sprinkle blocked a punt that Bill Wightkin fell on in the end zone for a 28–23 victory, while the Rams lost 44–17 to the 49ers, giving the Bears the lead in the National.
Week Seven (November 11) saw the Browns trailing the Eagles at home before preserving their American Conference lead with a 20–17 win.  The Rams' 45–21 win over the Cardinals, and the Bears' 41–28 loss to the Lions, gave the Rams and Bears 5–2–0 records.
In Week Eight (November 18), the Giants hosted a rematch with the Browns and lost again, 10–0; the Giants would finish 9–2–1, with both losses courtesy of the 11–1–0 Browns.
Week Nine began with a Thursday night game in Detroit, in which the Lions beat Green Bay, 52–35, to raise its record to 6–2–1.  On (November 25), the Browns beat the Bears, 42–21, in Cleveland.  The Browns were penalized 22 times, but still salvaged the victory.  Consequently, the 22 in-game infractions committed by the Browns made Cleveland the first NFL team to win a game, despite being penalized that many times.   The Rams also lost, 31–21, at Washington, and both fell to 6–3–0, giving the Lions the National Conference lead.  Meanwhile, the New York Yanks played spoiler again, tying the 49ers, 10–10, while staying winless at 0–7–2.  As with Detroit's earlier tie with the Yanks, the 49ers would regret having a win taken away later.
In Week Ten (December 2), the 49ers beat the Lions 20–10, while the Rams triumphed over the Bears 42–17, giving L.A. the top spot in a tight National Conference race.  The New York Yanks finally won a game, 31–28 at Green Bay.
In the penultimate regular games of the season in Week Eleven December 9, the Lions held the Rams to field goals five times, and the lone L.A. touchdown wasn't enough to keep Detroit from winning 24–22.  Meanwhile, wins by the Bears and the 49ers made a four team National Conference race, with Lions (7–3–1) in front of the Rams and Bears (both 7–4–0) and the 49ers (6–4–1) with one game left. But for the tying scores that had been made by the mediocre Yanks, the Lions and 49ers would have been 8–3 and 7–4.
Detroit, which had lost at home to San Francisco a week before, would face them again on the coast on December 16 in Week Twelve.  The Lions led by 3 points in San Francisco with one quarter left, but lost the game 21–17, along with the National Conference title as both teams finished 7–4–1.  The Bears were stunned by the Cardinals, 24–14, finishing 7–5–0.  The Los Angeles Rams, who had been tied with the Green Bay 14–14 at halftime, poured on four touchdowns in the second half for a 42–14 win, an 8–4–0 record, and the right to host Cleveland in the 1951 NFL championship.  At Yankee Stadium, only 6,658 spectators turned out to watch the last game ever for the New York Yanks, who lost to the crosstown Giants 27–17.

Conference races

Final standings

NFL Championship Game

Los Angeles 24, Cleveland 17 at Los Angeles Memorial Coliseum, Los Angeles, December 23, 1951

League leaders

Awards
 UPI NFL Most Valuable Player – Otto Graham, Cleveland Browns

Coaching changes

Offseason
Detroit Lions: Bo McMillin was replaced by Buddy Parker.
New York Yanks: Red Strader was replaced by James Phelan.
Philadelphia Eagles: Greasy Neale was replaced by Bo McMillin.

In-season
Chicago Cardinals: Curly Lambeau resigned after 10 games. Phil Handler and Cecil Isbell served as co-head coaches for the final two games of the season.
Philadelphia Eagles: Bo McMillin retired after two games after he was diagnosed with terminal stomach cancer. Wayne Millner served as interim for the rest of the season.
Washington Redskins: Herman Ball was fired after three games. Dick Todd served as interim for the rest of the season.

Deaths

January
January 16- Pid Purdy, age 46, Running Back and Placekicker for the Green Bay Packers from 1926-1927.

June
June 30- Don Murry, age 51, Guard and End for the Racine Legion and Chicago Bears from 1922-1932

References

 NFL Record and Fact Book
 NFL History 1951–1960 (Last accessed December 4, 2005)
 Total Football: The Official Encyclopedia of the National Football League

National Football League seasons